Montpelier, Virginia may refer to:
Montpelier, Charles City County, Virginia
Montpelier, Hanover County, Virginia
Montpelier (Orange, Virginia), estate and home of founding father James Madison